Schmekel was an all-transgender, Jewish folk punk band from Brooklyn, New York, known for their satirical lyrical material. Eddy Portnoy  of The Forward cited Schmekel as an example of the cultural movement "Queer Yiddishkeit." Schmekel made their audiences more comfortable with transgender topics through jokes, but also often included lyrical references to obscure queer, Jewish, and punk content that only cultural insiders would recognize. The Advocate (magazine) compared Schmekel to Pansy Division and Tribe 8, and the book Listen to Punk Rock! Exploring a Musical Genre compared Schmekel’s song “I’ll Be Your Maccabee” to Pansy Division’s song “Homo Christmas.” Susanne Mayer of Die Zeit contrasted the celebrities at the Metropolitan Museum of Art's fashion exhibit PUNK: Chaos to Couture with Schmekel's dirty song lyrics, antimilitarism, and criticism of same-sex marriage as bourgeois.

Members 

 Lucian Kahn – guitar, vocals
 Ricky Riot – keyboard, vocals
 Nogga Schwartz – bass guitar
 Simcha Halpert-Hanson – drums

Discography
 Queers On Rye (Riot Grrrl, Ink) – December 2011
The Whale That Ate Jonah (Schmekel Music) – October 2013

In literature
In the final Tales of the City novel, The Days of Anna Madrigal (2014), the character Jake reports his love interest, Amos, flirting with the lead singer of Schmekel.

In Jewish institutions
According to an interview with Tablet Magazine, the different members of Schmekel did different amounts of religious observance but they all had experienced difficulty in synagogue because of being transgender, which they addressed in their music. However, in an interview with Jewcy, they expressed feeling accepted at Congregation Beit Simchat Torah and Nehirim.

Other projects

Following the group's disbandment in 2014, keyboardist Itai Gal aka Ricky Riot formed a new project called Itai and the Ophanim, which released a debut album, Arise, in 2019. Singer and guitarist Lucian Kahn became a writer and game designer of tabletop role-playing games with LGBT, Jewish, and subcultural themes, making Dead Friend: A Game of Necromancy, Visigoths vs. Mall Goths, and If I Were a Lich, Man (Hit Point Press, 2023).

See also 

 Jews in punk rock

References

Transgender musicians
American LGBT musicians
Folk punk groups
Queercore groups
Musical groups from Brooklyn
Jewish folk rock groups
Jewish punk rock groups
Transgender Jews
Musical groups established in 2010
Musical groups disestablished in 2014
2010 establishments in New York City
2014 disestablishments in New York (state)
Transgender-related music